The following outline is provided as an overview of and topical guide to New Caledonia:

New Caledonia – "sui generis collectivity" (in practice an overseas territory) of France, comprising a main island (Grande Terre), the Loyalty Islands, and several smaller islands.  It is located in the region of Melanesia in the southwest Pacific. At about half the size of Taiwan, it has a land area of 18,575.5 square kilometres (7,172 sq mi). The population was 244,600 inhabitants as of January 2008 official estimates. The capital and largest city of the territory is Nouméa. The currency is the CFP franc.

Since 1986 the United Nations Committee on Decolonization has included New Caledonia on the United Nations list of non-self-governing territories. New Caledonia decided to remain within the French Republic after three referendums held in 2018, 2020, and 2021. The future status of New Caledonia (i.e. possibility of becoming an independent state) is not settled, however.

Its capital Nouméa is the seat of the regional organization the Secretariat of the Pacific Community (formerly the South Pacific Commission).

General reference

 Common English country name: New Caledonia
 Official English country name: New Caledonia
 Common endonym(s): List of countries and capitals in native languages
 Official endonym(s): List of official endonyms of present-day nations and states
 Adjectival(s): New Caledonian
 Demonym(s):
 Etymology: Name of New Caledonia
 ISO country codes: NC, NCL, 540
 ISO region codes: See ISO 3166-2:NC
 Internet country code top-level domain: .nc

Geography of New Caledonia

Geography of New Caledonia
 New Caledonia is: a "sui generis collectivity" (in practice an overseas territory) of France
 Location:
 Southern Hemisphere and Eastern Hemisphere
 Pacific Ocean
 West Pacific
 South Pacific Ocean
 Oceania
 Melanesia
 Time zone:  UTC+11
 Extreme points of New Caledonia
 High:  Mont Panie 
 Low:  Coral Sea 0 m
 Land boundaries: none
 Coastline: South Pacific Ocean 2,254 km
 Population of New Caledonia: 244,600 (January 1, 2008) - —th most populous country
 Area of New Caledonia: 18,575 km2
 Atlas of New Caledonia

Environment of New Caledonia

 Tropical Climate
 Renewable energy in New Caledonia
 Geology of New Caledonia
 Protected areas of New Caledonia
 Biosphere reserves in New Caledonia
 National parks of New Caledonia
 Wildlife of New Caledonia
 Fauna of New Caledonia
 Birds of New Caledonia
 Mammals of New Caledonia

Natural geographic features of New Caledonia
 Fjords of New Caledonia
 Glaciers of New Caledonia
 Islands of New Caledonia
 Lakes of New Caledonia
 Mountains of New Caledonia
 Volcanoes in New Caledonia
 Rivers of New Caledonia
 Waterfalls of New Caledonia
 Valleys of New Caledonia
 World Heritage Sites in New Caledonia

Administrative divisions of New Caledonia

Administrative divisions of New Caledonia
 Provinces of New Caledonia
 Districts of New Caledonia
 Municipalities of New Caledonia

Municipalities of New Caledonia
 Capital of New Caledonia: Nouméa
 Cities of New Caledonia

Demography of New Caledonia

Demographics of New Caledonia

Government and politics of New Caledonia

Politics of New Caledonia
 Form of government:
 Capital of New Caledonia: Nouméa
 Elections in New Caledonia
 Political parties in New Caledonia

Branches of the government of New Caledonia

Government of New Caledonia

Executive branch of the government of New Caledonia
 Head of state: President of New Caledonia,
 Head of government: Prime Minister of New Caledonia,
 Cabinet of New Caledonia

Legislative branch of the government of New Caledonia
 Parliament of New Caledonia (bicameral)
 Upper house: Senate of New Caledonia
 Lower house: House of Commons of New Caledonia

Judicial branch of the government of New Caledonia
 Supreme Court of New Caledonia

Foreign relations of New Caledonia

Foreign relations of New Caledonia
 Diplomatic missions in New Caledonia
 Diplomatic missions of New Caledonia
 France-New Caledonia relations

International organization membership
New Caledonia is a member of:
International Trade Union Confederation (ITUC)
Pacific Islands Forum (PIF) (associate member)
Secretariat of the Pacific Community (SPC)
Universal Postal Union (UPU)
World Federation of Trade Unions (WFTU)
World Meteorological Organization (WMO)

Military of New Caledonia

Military of New Caledonia
 Command
 Commander-in-chief: Brigadier General Martial de Braquilanges
 Ministry of Defence of New Caledonia
 Forces
 Army of New Caledonia
 Navy of New Caledonia
 Air Force of New Caledonia
 Special forces of New Caledonia
 Military history of New Caledonia
 Military ranks of New Caledonia

History of New Caledonia

History of New Caledonia

Culture of New Caledonia

Culture of New Caledonia
 Architecture of New Caledonia
 Cuisine of New Caledonia
 Festivals in New Caledonia
 Languages of New Caledonia
 Media in New Caledonia
 National symbols of New Caledonia
 Coat of arms of New Caledonia
 Flag of New Caledonia
 National Anthem of New Caledonia
 People of New Caledonia
 Public holidays in New Caledonia
 Records of New Caledonia
 Religion in New Caledonia
 Christianity in New Caledonia
 Hinduism in New Caledonia
 Islam in New Caledonia
 Judaism in New Caledonia
 Sikhism in New Caledonia
 World Heritage Sites in New Caledonia

Art in New Caledonia
 Art in New Caledonia
 Cinema of New Caledonia
 Literature of New Caledonia
 Music of New Caledonia
 Television in New Caledonia
 Theatre in New Caledonia

Economy and infrastructure of New Caledonia

Economy of New Caledonia
 Economic rank, by nominal GDP (2007): 147th (one hundred and forty seventh)
 Agriculture in New Caledonia
 Banking in New Caledonia
 National Bank of New Caledonia
 Communications in New Caledonia
 Internet in New Caledonia
 Companies of New Caledonia
 Currency of New Caledonia: Franc
 ISO 4217: XPF
 Energy in New Caledonia
 Energy policy of New Caledonia
 Oil industry in New Caledonia
 Mining in New Caledonia
 Tourism in New Caledonia
 Transport in New Caledonia
 New Caledonia Stock Exchange

Education in New Caledonia

Education in New Caledonia

Infrastructure of New Caledonia
 Health care in New Caledonia
 Transportation in New Caledonia
 Airports in New Caledonia
 Rail transport in New Caledonia
 Roads in New Caledonia
 Water supply and sanitation in New Caledonia

See also

New Caledonia
 Index of New Caledonia-related articles
 List of international rankings
 List of New Caledonia-related topics
 Outline of France
 Outline of geography
 Outline of Oceania

References

External links

 Official website 
 
 Lonely Planet WorldGuide profile
  Website for l'Association Endemia: New Caledonian biodiversity
  past and current developments of France's overseas administrative divisions like New Caledonia
  Brousse-en-folie A popular local comic strip series
 General information and maps of the provinces, municipalities and the tribal zones

 Tourism
  Tourism Information of New-Caledonia
 Surf New Caledonia
 Diving in New Caledonia

New Caledonia
 
New Caledonia-related lists